Mari Kim Holden (born March 30, 1971) is an American Olympic medalist and World Champion in the sport of cycling. She won a silver medal in the 2000 Olympic Games time trial in Sydney, Australia and the world time trial championship later that year. She also won six U.S. championships, becoming the first American woman to win three consecutive U.S. time trial championships (1998–2000) and scoring a double by winning the U.S. time trial and road championships in 1999. In 2016 she was inducted into the U.S. Bicycling Hall of Fame as a Modern Road and Track Competitor and presently works as a community director at USA Cycling.

Career
Born in Milwaukee, Wisconsin, Holden was a two-time member of the U.S. junior world triathlon team, and was named junior triathlete of the year in 1991 by the Triathlon Federation USA. That year she finished seventh in the junior triathlon world championship.

She began cycling with a club in high school as part of a fitness program centered on triathlon, and did not make competitive cycling her focus until 1992 when she moved to Colorado Springs and began training with the U.S. cycling team to improve her triathlon. She also transferred to University of Colorado at Colorado Springs, where she majored in philosophy.

After finishing sixth in the national time trial championship in 1993, Holden sat out much of 1994 with a compression fracture in her back. She came back the following two years, winning the time trial championship in 1995 and 1996.

The 1996 event was part of the trial to select members of the Olympic team. Selection was on overall performance in time trials and road races, and although Holden won both time trials, she did not fare so well in the road race and failed to qualify.

Holden raced in Europe. In 1999, she finished second in the Women's Challenge against an international field and in the top 10 in the Grande Boucle.

The following year, she won a silver medal at the Olympics, followed by a victory two weeks later in the world time trial championship in Plouay, France.

That year (2000), Holden was elected to the board of directors of USA Cycling and re-elected in 2004. She formerly served on the athletic advisory committee to the U.S. Olympic Committee and was athlete ambassador to the U.S. Anti-Doping Agency.

Holden coaches and holds cycling clinics and cycling camps as well as serves as a consultant on women's cycling issues and products. She was called one of the "greatest ambassadors in the sport of cycling" by Ride Magazine (March, 2008).

She joined the staff of USA Cycling in 2019 and is a community director, leading Let’s Ride, a nationwide youth cycling program.

Career achievements

Major results

1991
 7th ITU Junior World Triathlon Championships

1995
 1st  Time trial, National Road Championships
 1st John Stenner Memorial time trial
 1st Louisville Criterium
 1st Point Mogu Criterium
 3rd Overall Women's Challenge
1 stage win
 3rd Redlands Bicycle Classic
 National record —  time trial: 51 minutes, 36.24 seconds

1996
 1st  Time trial, National Road Championships (US Olympic Trials Time Trial #2)
 1st Overall 89er stage race
2 stage wins
 1st US Olympic Trials Time Trial #1
 Bohemia Crystal Tour
2 stage wins
 2nd Overall Tour of Tucson
1 stage win
 2nd Can/Pro Cycling Series

1997
 1st Overall Red River Classic Stage Race
 1st Meridian Bicycle Classic
 National Road Championships
2nd Road race
2nd Time trial
 7th Time trial, UCI Road World Championships

1998
 1st  Time trial, National Road Championships
 1st Overall Street Skills Stage Race
1 stage win
 1st Overall Redlands Bicycle Classic
 1st Mountains classification Women's Challenge
 2nd Vuelta International a Majorca Feminas
 3rd Grand Prix des Nations
 7th Time trial, UCI Road World Championships

1999
 National Road Championships
1st  Road race
1st  Time trial
 2nd Overall Women's Challenge
1st Mountains classification
1st Stage 3
 2nd Trofeo Alfredo Binda-Comune di Cittiglio
 4th Overall Street Skills Stage Race
 7th Overall Tour de Snowy
1st Stage 2 (ITT)
 8th Overall Grande Boucle Féminine Internationale
 8th La Flèche Wallonne Féminine

2000 – Timex
 1st  Time trial, UCI Road World Championships
 1st  Time trial, National Road Championships
 1st Overall Tour of the Gila
 1st Overall Tour of Willamette
1st Stages 3 & 4 (ITT)
 1st Mountains classification Thüringen Rundfahrt der Frauen
 2nd Time trial, Olympic Games
 2nd Overall Sea Otter Classic
 4th Overall Tour de Snowy

2001
 1st Mountains classification Giro d'Italia Femminile
 2nd Time trial, National Road Championships
 6th New Zealand World Cup

2002
 8th Australia World Cup

2004
 1st New York City Invitational

Awards
 1991: United States Junior Triathlete of the Year

Personal
Her last name was Holden-Paulsen while married as a young adult.

References

External links

1971 births
Living people
American female cyclists
Cyclists at the 2000 Summer Olympics
Olympic silver medalists for the United States in cycling
UCI Road World Champions (women)
Medalists at the 2000 Summer Olympics
Pan American Games medalists in cycling
Pan American Games bronze medalists for the United States
Sportspeople from Milwaukee
Cyclists at the 1999 Pan American Games
21st-century American women
Cyclists from Wisconsin